Carl Svante Janson (born 21 May 1955) is a Swedish mathematician. A member of the Royal Swedish Academy of Sciences since 1994, Janson has been the chaired professor of mathematics at Uppsala University since 1987.

In mathematical analysis, Janson has publications in functional analysis (especially harmonic analysis) and probability theory. In mathematical statistics, Janson has made contributions to the theory of U-statistics.  In combinatorics, Janson has publications in probabilistic combinatorics, particularly random graphs and in the analysis of algorithms: In the study of random graphs, Janson introduced U-statistics and the Hoeffding decomposition.

Janson has published four books and over 300 academic papers. He has an Erdős number of 1.

Biography
Svante Janson has already had a long career in mathematics, because he started research at a very young age.

From prodigy to docent
A child prodigy in mathematics, Janson took high-school and even university classes while in primary school. He was admitted in 1968 to Gothenburg University at age 12. After his 1968 matriculation at Uppsala University at age 13, Janson obtained the following degrees in mathematics: a "candidate of philosophy" (roughly an "honours" B.S. with a thesis) at age 14 (in 1970) and a doctor of philosophy at age 21–22 (in 1977). Janson's Ph.D. was awarded on his 22nd birthday. Janson's doctoral dissertation was supervised by Lennart Carleson, who had himself received his doctoral degree when he was 22 years old.

After having earned his doctorate, Janson was a postdoc with the Mittag-Leffler Institute from 1978 to 1980. Thereafter he worked at Uppsala University. Janson's ongoing research earned him another PhD from Uppsala University in 1984 – this second doctoral degree being in mathematical statistics; the  supervisor was Carl-Gustav Esseen.

In 1984, Janson was hired by Stockholm University as docent (roughly associate professor in the USA).

Professorships
In 1985 Janson returned to Uppsala University, where he was named the chaired professor in mathematical statistics. In 1987 Janson became the chaired professor of mathematics at Uppsala university. Traditionally in Sweden, the chaired professor has had the role of a "professor ordinarius" in a German university (roughly combining the roles of research professor and director of graduate studies at a research university in the USA).

Awards
Besides being a member of the Royal Swedish Academy of Sciences (KVA), Svante Janson is a member of the Royal Society of Sciences in Uppsala. His thesis received the 1978 Sparre Award from the KVA. He received the 1994 Swedish medal for the best young mathematical scientist, the Göran Gustafsson Prize. Janson's former doctoral student, Ola Hössjer, received the Göran Gustafsson prize in 2009, becoming the first statistician so honored.

In December 2009, Janson received the Eva & Lars Gårding prize from the Royal Physiographic Society in Lund.
In 2021, Janson received the Flajolet Lecture Prize.  He will deliver the Flajolet Lecture at the 2022 AofA conference.

Works by Janson

Books

Selected articles
  (Janson's inequality)

References

Svante Janson's homepage at Uppsala University. Accessed 2010-06-27.
Curriculum Vitæ for Svante Janson. Accessed 2010-06-27.
Mathematical works by Svante Janson, Department of Mathematics, Uppsala University. Accessed 2010-06-27.
Details of seminar given by Janson on May 7th 2010 to the Microsoft Research Theory Group. Accessed 2010-06-27.
Member record for Svante Janson. Swedish Academy of Sciences. Accessed 2010-06-27.

External links

 
 

Members of the Royal Swedish Academy of Sciences
Probability theorists
Functional analysts
Graph theorists
Mathematical analysts 
20th-century  Swedish mathematicians
21st-century  Swedish mathematicians
Swedish statisticians
Academic staff of Uppsala University
Uppsala University alumni
Living people
1955 births
Members of the Royal Society of Sciences in Uppsala